Associated Grocers of Maine was a retailers' cooperative serving independent supermarkets in Maine, New Hampshire, Vermont, and Massachusetts, USA. It was founded in 1953 and was a member of Retailer Owned Food Distributors & Associates. It distributed Shurfine products in its stores.  It went into receivership on April 26, 2011.

External links 
 Associated Grocers of Maine web site

References 

Companies based in Maine
Economy of the Northeastern United States
American companies established in 1953
Retail companies established in 1953
American companies disestablished in 2011
Retail companies disestablished in 2011
Supermarkets of the United States
Retailers' cooperatives in the United States
1953 establishments in Maine
2011 disestablishments in Maine